Stefan Klinger (born 24 April 1978) is a German ski mountaineer.

Klinger was born in Anger. He inspired his girl friend Stefanie Koch to compete also in the national ski mountaineering team.

Selected results 
 2003:
 1st, Predigtstuhl race
 2004: 
 6th, Mountain Attack
 11th, World Championship relay race (together with Tim Stachel, Gerhard Reithmeier and Toni Steurer)
 2005: 
 4th, German Championship single
 3rd, European Championship relay race (together with Toni Steurer, Franz Graßl and Georg Nickaes)
 5th, Mountain Attack
 2007: 
 3rd, German Championship single
 3rd, German Championship vertical race
 4th, European Championship relay race (together with Toni Steurer, Konrad Lex and Martin Echtler)
 2008:
 1st, German Championship team
 6th, World Championship relay race (together with Toni Steurer, Andreas Strobel and Konrad Lex)
 8th (and 6th in the "international men" ranking), Patrouille des Glaciers (together with Toni Steurer and Franz Graßl)

External links 
 Stefan Klinger at skimountaineering.com

References 

1978 births
Living people
German male ski mountaineers
People from Berchtesgadener Land
Sportspeople from Upper Bavaria